Dan L. DeGrow (born June 28, 1953) was the former superintendent of the St. Clair County RESA, and a Republican former member of both houses of the Michigan Legislature, serving portions of the Thumb for just over two decades.

DeGrow was elected to the Michigan House of Representatives in 1980 and served one term. In 1982, he was elected to the Michigan Senate and served for 20 years. DeGrow was named the chamber's majority leader in 1999. When he was forced from office due to the state's term limits, he was recognized for his "outstanding leadership" during a "most impressive tenure of commitment to the people of this state."

During his tenure, he was recognized with a number of awards, including being named legislator of the year by three organizations, and twice voted one of the ten best legislators by The Detroit News.

Upon leaving the Senate, DeGrow became superintendent of the St. Clair County Regional Educational Service Agency.

References

1953 births
Living people
Republican Party members of the Michigan House of Representatives
20th-century American politicians
21st-century American politicians
Republican Party Michigan state senators
People from Ann Arbor, Michigan